Casey is a township in the Canadian province of Ontario, located within the Timiskaming District.

The township had a population of 368 in the Canada 2016 Census. The main communities in the township are Belle Vallée, Judge, and Pearson.  The municipal offices are located in Belle Vallée.

The township is named after George Elliott Casey, member of the House of Commons of Canada from 1872 to 1900.

Demographics 

Mother tongue (2006):
 English as first language: 28.6%
 French as first language: 71.4%
 English and French as first language: 0%
 Other as first language: 0%

See also
List of townships in Ontario
List of francophone communities in Ontario

References

External links

Municipalities in Timiskaming District
Single-tier municipalities in Ontario
Township municipalities in Ontario